Robert Penn is an American blues musician.

Born in Riverside, California, United States, he moved to the Detroit, Michigan area at a young age.  He is notable for having performed with a wide variety of well-known musicians including B.B. King, Aretha Franklin and Ray Charles, for leading the Robert Penn Blues Band, and for being an international blues performer.

References

External links
Official website

American blues guitarists
American male guitarists
Detroit blues musicians
Year of birth missing (living people)
Living people
Musicians from Riverside, California
Guitarists from Detroit
Guitarists from California